Keeaumoku may refer to:
 Keeaumoku Nui or Kalani Kama Keʻeaumoku-nui (18th-century), grandfather of King Kamehameha I
 Keeaumoku Papaiahiahi or Keʻeaumoku Pāpaʻiahiahi (1736–1804), father of Queen Kaahumanu
 Keeaumoku II or George Cox Kahekili Keʻeaumoku II (1784 - 1824), brother of Queen Kaahumanu